The Research Institute of Industrial Economics (in Swedish Institutet för Näringslivsforskning, IFN) is a private  independent research foundation based in Stockholm, Sweden. Professor Magnus Henrekson is the managing director of the Institute and Professor Lars Persson is the deputy director. In addition, approximately 30 researchers are employed at IFN and about as many are affiliated to the institute.
 
The institute was founded in 1939. Ivar Andersson became the first managing director of the institute and Sigrid Edström its first chairman.

External links 
 Official webpage
 Working Paper series at IDEAS

Economic research institutes
Research institutes in Sweden